The 1950 Goodwood Trophy was a non-championship Formula One motor race held at Goodwood Circuit on 30 September 1950.

Classification

Race

References

Goodwood Trophy
1950 in English sport
1950 in British motorsport